Simply Christmas, the second album and first Christmas album by American actor and singer Leslie Odom Jr., features jazz interpretations of Christmas standards. It was released in November 2016. A year later, in October 2017, a deluxe edition was released with four additional songs.

Background
Odom was signed to a four-album deal with S-Curve Records in 2016. The first album, an updated and improved re-release of Leslie Odom Jr., was released in June 2016, before Odom left the Broadway cast of Hamilton, and charted at No. 1 on Billboard Jazz and No. 147 on Billboard 200.

Production
Odom had frequently been asked by fans to make a Christmas album, leading to the creation of Simply Christmas. Odom strove for a more unique sound: "I didn’t want it to be sad. I didn’t want it to be sullen. But I don’t think the album was really ever cheerful," he said in an interview.

Before recording, Odom and producer Steve Greenberg developed a list of 75–100 Christmas songs to choose from. Odom referred to the Carpenters' song "Merry Christmas Darling" as a "surprise" addition from Greenberg that Odom didn't expect to work, "but it ended up working."

After recording Simply Christmas, Odom was dissatisfied with the initial result. He told The Wall Street Journal:

On November 11, 2016, after Odom rerecorded a number of tracks, S-Curve released Simply Christmas as Odom's second album.

In an interview with the New York Observer, Odom added that he wanted to create an album that didn't feel disconnected from the political climate, an album with a "finger on the pulse of the time we're living in." He also noted, "We give ourselves permission to abandon ship if a project isn't working out. We'd rather walk out then put something out that's subpar. We didn't know if the Christmas album would be something we're proud of, but it is."

2017 deluxe reissue
For the 2017 Christmas season, a deluxe edition of the album was released in October 2017 with four additional songs: "The Christmas Waltz", "Christmas", "Edelweiss", and "Please Come Home for Christmas".

Promotion
Odom toured in 2016 and 2017 to promote the album, performing concerts backed by a jazz quintet that included a drummer, percussionist, bassist, guitarist, and a pianist who is also Odom's musical director.

Track listing

Charts

References

2016 Christmas albums
Christmas albums by American artists
Leslie Odom Jr. albums
Jazz Christmas albums
S-Curve Records albums